4-Amino-2,2,6,6-tetramethyl-4-piperidine is an organic compound with the formula H2NCH(CH2CMe2)2NH (where Me = CH3).  Classified as a diamine, it is a colorless oily liquid.

The compound is an intermediate in the preparation of Bobbitt's salt, an oxidant used in organic synthesis.  It is prepared by the reductive amination of the corresponding ketone:

OC(CH2CMe2)2NH  +  NH3  +  H2  →   H2NCH(CH2CMe2)2NH  +   H2O

Compound Properties

Boiling point is 188.5 °C 
Melting point  is 17 °C.  
Density is 0.8966 g/cm3 @ Temp: 20 °C

Toxicity
A study by Truda et al, has reported the median lethal dose LD(50) as 906mg/kg in rats. 
.

References

Related compounds
Pempidine
2,2,6,6-Tetramethylpiperidine

Further reading 
    
 
   
 

Piperidines
Diamines